Almost Famous is the debut studio album by American R&B singer Lumidee, released by Universal Records on June 24, 2003.

It peaked at number twenty-two on the U.S. Billboard 200 chart and number eleven on the U.S. Billboard Top R&B/Hip-Hop Albums. It included the summer hit "Never Leave You (Uh Oooh, Uh Oooh)", which saw international success, topping the charts in Germany, Italy, the Netherlands, Belgium, Switzerland and reaching number 2 in the UK and number 3 on the U.S. Billboard Hot 100.

Singles
"Never Leave You (Uh Oooh, Uh Oooh)" is the debut single and the first single released from the album. It was released worldwide on August 4, 2003.
"Crashin' A Party" was the second single released from the album. It was released to radio on December 23, 2003.

Critical reception

Almost Famous received two out of five stars by AllMusic citing, "Otherwise, Almost Famous is simply so-so R&B that never recalls the single's appeal but is not the disaster that albums surrounding fluke hits can turn into". Rolling Stone also gave it a two out of five rating.

Track listing

Charts

References

Lumidee albums
2003 debut albums
Albums produced by Buckwild
Universal Records albums